"Only Girl (In the World)" is a song by Barbadian singer Rihanna from her fifth album, Loud (2010). Serving as the album's lead single, it was released on September 10, 2010. Crystal Johnson wrote the song in collaboration with producers Stargate and Sandy Vee. Rihanna contacted Stargate before Loud production and asked them to create lively, uptempo music. "Only Girl (In the World)" was the first song composed for the album, and the singer decided to include it on the track list before she recorded her vocals. Backed by strong bass and synthesizer, it is a dance-pop and Eurodance song that has an electronic composition. Its lyrics describe  Rihanna demanding physical attention from her lover.

Critical response to "Only Girl (In the World)" was positive; a number of critics praised its composition and Rihanna's decision to move away from the dark themes of her previous album, Rated R (2009). The song reached number one on the United States' Billboard Hot 100 chart two weeks after Loud second single, "What's My Name?", peaked at number one. It was the first time in the chart's history that an album's lead single reached number one after its second single. In the United Kingdom the song spent two weeks at number one and is the 19th-bestselling single of all time by a female artist, with over a million copies sold. The song peaked at number one in Australia, Austria, New Zealand, Canada and Ireland, and reached the top five in France, Germany and Switzerland.

Rihanna performed "Only Girl (In the World)" on Saturday Night Live in the United States, The X Factor in the United Kingdom and a shortened version at the 31st Brit Awards. She also performed the song at the Super Bowl LVII halftime show in a medley with Where Have You Been. Anthony Mandler directed the song's music video, in which Rihanna is alone in an open natural landscape. The video suggests that she is the only female in the world, echoing the song's title and lyrics, and critics praised its bright, colorful theme. "Only Girl (In the World)" won the Grammy Award for Best Dance/Electronic Recording at the 53rd Annual Grammy Awards in 2011.

Concept and development

"Only Girl (In the World)" was written by Crystal Johnson with the song's producers, Stargate and Sandy Vee. Rihanna had previously worked with Stargate on the singles "Hate That I Love You", "Don't Stop the Music" and "Rude Boy". In February 2011, Stargate said that Rihanna approached the Norwegian production duo before she began recording the then-untitled project, saying that she wanted to have fun and produce happy, uptempo songs. According to Tor Erik Hermansen of Stargate, "Only Girl (In the World)" was the first song created for Loud and Rihanna decided to include it on the album before recording her vocals. In a webchat with fans, Rihanna said that she wanted to take the next step as an artist: "I didn't want to go backward and remake Good Girl Gone Bad. I wanted the next step in the evolution of Rihanna, and it's perfect for us. You guys are always defending me, so now you've got some great songs to justify it." The singer described "Only Girl (In the World)" as having a "bigger sound" than "Rude Boy".

The song was recorded during Rihanna's Last Girl on Earth tour. Its instrumental was recorded by Mikkel Storleer Eriksen of Stargate and Miles Walker at Roc the Mic Studios in New York City and Westlake Recording Studios in Los Angeles, and by Vee at the Bunker in Paris. Kuk Harrell produced Rihanna's vocals, recording them with Josh Gudwin and Marcos Tovar. Inaam Haq, Dane Liska and Brad Shea recorded additional vocals. The song was mixed by Phil Tan at the Ninja Beat Club in Atlanta and by Vee at The Bunker, with engineering by Damien Lewis. Eriksen, Vee and Hermansen provided the instrumentation, and Johnson sang background vocals.

Composition
"Only Girl (In the World)" is a Eurodance and dance-pop song. It is in the key of F minor (B minor in the chorus), and written in common time with a moderate tempo of 126 beats per minute. Its instrumentation includes synthesizers, a "heavy whipping bass" and a "strobing" electro beat. Brad Wete of Entertainment Weekly described the song as a "stronger, sexier" version of her 2007 single, "Don't Stop the Music".

Rihanna's voice spans one-and-a-half octaves in "Only Girl (In the World)", from F3 to C5, and her vocal has a "silky", "seductive" tone. In the song's lyrics Rihanna yearns for her lover's attention, which makes her feel like the only girl in the world. The singer "pours her heart out" in the chorus: "Want you to make me feel like I'm the only girl in the world/ Like I'm the only one that you'll ever love/ Like I'm the only one who knows your heart/ Only girl in the world." According to Digital Spy writer Nick Levine, the chorus "thumps like a rabbit having an epileptic fit." Rihanna sings suggestively, "Baby, I'll tell you all my secrets that I'm keepin'/ You can come inside/ And when you enter, you ain't leavin'/ Be my prisoner for the night." Fraser McAlpine of the BBC compared the song's message to that of the German fairy tale "Rapunzel"; Rihanna is not willing to throw her hair out of the castle for just any man to come and satisfy her, "particularly not someone who isn't prepared to make the climb up to her scarily high window."

Critical reception
The song received a generally positive response from music critics. Gerrick D. Kennedy of the Los Angeles Times called the track a "surefire hit" and something of a "comeback". MTV News writer James Dinh praised the uptempo song, comparing it to the "stark" lead single "Russian Roulette" from Rihanna's previous Rated R. Monica Herrera wrote for Billboard that "Only Girl (In the World)" "aims squarely for dance-floor domination." Nick Levine of Digital Spy gave the song four stars out of five, calling it a "crowd-pleaser" but not overly original.

According to Levine and Jim Farber of the New York Daily News, "Only Girl (In the World)" was Rihanna's most pop-sounding song since "Don't Stop the Music". Analyzing the song, the BBC's Fraser McAlpine questioned why "Only Girl (In the World)" leaves a "positive impression" on the listener despite its arrogant, domineering tone. Critical at first ("Listen to the pneumatic hiss at the heart of this song. Try and endure the pumping thrust without getting winded. There is simply too much pressure being stuffed into our ears, with too much brutal force"), he concluded that Rihanna sings the song with great passion and gave it four stars out of five. James Dolan gave the song two-and-a-half stars out of five in Rolling Stone, writing that "the trance beat won't keep you in the club unless someone else is paying for the drinks."

Chart performance

North America
In the United States, "Only Girl (In the World)" debuted at number 75 on the Billboard Hot 100 on September 25, 2010, jumping to number three the following week, before peaking at number one (Rihanna's ninth) on November 25. Loud second single, "What's My Name?" (featuring Drake), topped the Hot 100 two weeks before; it was the first time in chart history that an album's first single reached number one after its second. "Only Girl (In the World)" was Rihanna's fourth number-one song of 2010, and she was the first female and the first artist since Usher (in 2004) with four number-one singles in a calendar year. The singer also had the most number-one singles (nine) since 2000. "Only Girl (In the World)" appeared on the Billboard Hot 100 year-end chart in 2010 and 2011 at numbers 47 and 40, respectively.

The song debuted on the Digital Songs chart at number one with sales of 249,000, Rihanna's eighth number-one single and her sixth to debut atop the chart (the most in both categories by any artist since the chart's 2005 introduction). The singer set a Mainstream Top 40 (Pop Songs) radio-airplay chart record when "Only Girl (In the World)" rose from number two to number one on November 25, 2010, her seventh number-one. The song was number 46 and number 33, respectively, on the 2011 Billboard Digital Songs and Pop Songs year-end charts. "Only Girl (In the World)" was Rihanna's twelfth number-one on the Dance Club Songs songs chart and number 46 on the 2010 Billboard year-end chart. The song has been certified six times platinum by the Recording Industry Association of America (RIAA), and has sold 3.6 million copies in the US as of June 2015. In Canada, "Only Girl (In the World)" debuted at number 65 on September 25, 2010, and rose to number one for a week the following week. On November 6 the song returned to number one for three consecutive weeks, remaining on the chart for a total of 35 weeks.

United Kingdom
In the United Kingdom "Only Girl (In the World)" debuted at number two on the UK Singles Chart on October 31, 2010, with 126,000 copies sold. Cheryl Cole debuted at number one with "Promise This", selling 157,000 copies, and Cole and Rihanna had the highest and second-highest debut sales figures of the year. The song rose to number one the next week for two consecutive weeks. It was Rihanna's fourth UK number-one single, following "Umbrella" (2007), "Take a Bow" (2008) and "Run This Town" (2009). By December 2011 "Only Girl (In the World)" was the 108th song to sell more than a million copies in the United Kingdom, the fifteenth by a female artist, Rihanna's first as primary artist and second overall; the 107th million-seller was Eminem's "Love the Way You Lie" six weeks before, on which Rihanna was featured.

Rihanna was the second non-United Kingdom, non-North American million-selling artist; the first was Danish singer Whigfield with her 1994 song, "Saturday Night". Although at the time the only other female two-song million-seller was Canadian singer Celine Dion, two of Rihanna's subsequent singles—"We Found Love" (2011) and "Diamonds" (2012)—have also sold more than a million copies each. "Only Girl (In the World)" is the nineteenth-bestselling single by a female artist and the 99th overall of all time in the United Kingdom. The song was the fourth- and 68th-bestselling single, respectively, of 2010 and 2011. Certified platinum by the British Phonographic Industry (BPI) for shipments exceeding 600,000 copies, it has sold 1,080,000 copies. "Only Girl (In the World)" peaked at number one on the UK Single Downloads Chart and the Scottish Singles Chart.

Music video

Director Anthony Mandler filmed the music video for "Only Girl (In the World)" at a location two hours from Los Angeles. Frank Gatson Jr., choreographed the "Only Girl" music video.  Rihanna told JustJared.com that the video was filmed in a "big landscape" so she was the only person in the frame, echoing the song's title. The singer is also "frolicking in a red field and lying in a bed of flowers." The video features large balloons in different colours, a swing hanging from the sky and a tree with multi-colored lights. Rihanna's outfits include a mohair sweater, a floral miniskirt and a white-bra-and-boyshorts two-piece.

Entertainment Weekly writer Tanner Stransky praised the video's simplicity, noting that it seems "as if Rihanna is speaking directly to you, the viewer, and she is your one and only amid swallowing rolling, beautiful, swallowing landscapes. It's an effect that makes you focus squarely on [Rihanna], who's ensconced in flirty outfits." According to Joyce Lee of CBS, Rihanna appeared to have progressed from the "edgy" music videos of the Rated R singles to a more feminine, colourful tone. Seth Sommerfield of Spin echoed Lee's comments, calling it "whimsical [and] beautiful". Billboard reviewer Jason Lipshutz described the tree with flashing lights as "surreal imagery."

Usage in media
The song has appeared on the videogames Just Dance 3 and Grand Theft Auto V. The song was also featured in the 2015 DreamWorks Animation movie Home.

Live performances and covers

Rihanna performed "Only Girl (In the World)" and a solo version of "What's My Name?" on Saturday Night Live in New York City on October 30, 2010. The next day, she flew to London to perform the song on The X Factor. On November 7 she performed the song at the MTV Europe Music Awards in Madrid. Two days later, Rihanna sang "Only Girl (In the World)" on the Italian version of The X Factor in a floral-print bikini, boots and a red pigtail. The next day she flew to France to sing the song on Le Grand Journal, on a set covered with white balloons.

The singer returned to London on November 11 to record an interview for The Graham Norton Show, which included a live performance of "Only Girl (In the World)". Rihanna opened the American Music Awards with a medley of songs from Loud. She began with an a cappella version of "Love the Way You Lie (Part II)", sitting on a stylized tree of lights above "a field of sable-colored blades of grass." Rihanna then sang a solo version of "What's My Name?" and a short version of "Only Girl (In the World)". According to Mawuse Ziegbe of MTV News, the singer "kicked up the island theme" as drummers in tribal dress circled her.

Rihanna performed a short version of "Only Girl (In the World)" at the 31st Brit Awards on February 15, 2011, as part of a medley with two other singles from Loud: "S&M" and "What's My Name?". She had planned to perform "S&M" only (to coincide with its United Kingdom release), but was asked by the British Phonographic Industry to "tone down the sexual references in the song's lyrics". Rihanna was reportedly angered at the request and a related one to perform a different song. She made the changes because the BPI wanted to avoid complaints like those received after the seventh-series finale of The X Factor on December 11, 2010. Rihanna performed "Only Girl (In the World)", "California King Bed", "What's My Name?" and "S&M" on NBC's May 27, 2011 Today as part of its summer concert series. The song, which was included on the Loud, 777 and the Diamonds World Tours, was the opener for her performance at Radio 1's Hackney Weekend on May 24, 2012. She also performed the song at the 2016 MTV Video Music Awards. She performed the song as part of her set during the halftime show of Super Bowl LVII.

Katy Perry covered "Only Girl (In the World)" as part of an acoustic mash-up with Willow Smith's "Whip My Hair" on her California Dreams Tour (2011). Ellie Goulding covered the song during her appearance on Radio 1's Live Lounge, and the cover was the B-side of her single "Lights".

American experimental band Xiu Xiu covered the song on a 7-inch single in 2011.

Track listing

Digital download
"Only Girl (In the World)" – 3:55

Digital download (Extended Club)
"Only Girl (In the World)" (Extended Club) – 5:38

German CD single
"Only Girl (In the World)" – 3:55
"Only Girl (In the World)" (Extended Club Mix) – 5:39

UK CD single
"Only Girl (In the World)" (Album Version) – 3:55
"Only Girl (In the World)" (Instrumental) – 3:55

Digital download (Remixes)
"Only Girl (In the World)" (The Bimbo Jones Radio) – 3:52		
"Only Girl (In the World)" (Rosabel's "Only Radio Edit In The World") – 4:09		
"Only Girl (In the World)" (Mixin Marc & Tony Svejda Radio Mix) – 4:10		
"Only Girl (In the World)" (CCW Radio Mix) – 3:42		
"Only Girl (In the World)" (The Bimbo Jones Club) – 7:17		
"Only Girl (In the World)" (Rosabel's "Only Club In The World") – 8:35		
"Only Girl (In the World)" (Mixin Marc & Tony Svejda Club Mix) – 6:25		
"Only Girl (In the World)" (CCW Blow It Up Club Mix) – 9:44		
"Only Girl (In the World)" (The Bimbo Jones Dub) – 7:32		
"Only Girl (In the World)" (Rosabel's "Only Dub In The World") – 8:21		
"Only Girl (In the World)" (Mixin Marc & Tony Svejda Instrumental) – 6:23		
"Only Girl (In the World)" (CCW Dub) – 7:27

Awards

Charts

Weekly charts

Year-end charts

All-time charts

Certifications

Release history

See also

List of number-one singles of 2010 (Australia)
List of number-one hits of 2010 (Austria)
List of Canadian Hot 100 number-one singles of 2010
List of European number-one hits of 2010
List of number-one singles of 2010 (Ireland)
List of number-one hits of 2010 (Italy)
List of number-one singles from the 2010s (New Zealand)
List of number-one songs in Norway
List of number-one singles of 2010 (Poland)
List of number-one dance singles of 2010 (Poland)
List of number-one digital songs of 2010 (U.S.)
List of UK Singles Chart number ones of the 2010s
List of Billboard Hot 100 number ones of 2010
List of Billboard Hot Dance Club Songs number ones of 2010
List of Billboard Mainstream Top 40 number-one songs of 2010
List of Eurodance songs

Notes

References

2010 songs
2010 singles
Rihanna songs
Billboard Hot 100 number-one singles
Canadian Hot 100 number-one singles
Def Jam Recordings singles
Dance-pop songs
European Hot 100 Singles number-one singles
Irish Singles Chart number-one singles
Music videos directed by Anthony Mandler
Number-one singles in Australia
Number-one singles in Austria
Ultratop 50 Singles (Wallonia) number-one singles
Number-one singles in Italy
Number-one singles in New Zealand
Number-one singles in Norway
Number-one singles in Poland
Number-one singles in Romania
Number-one singles in Scotland
Eurodance songs
Song recordings produced by Stargate (record producers)
UK Singles Chart number-one singles
Songs written by Sandy Vee
Grammy Award for Best Dance Recording
Songs written by Crystal Nicole
Song recordings produced by Sandy Vee
Songs written by Mikkel Storleer Eriksen
Songs written by Tor Erik Hermansen
Ellie Goulding songs